Kataja is an islet and the easternmost point of Sweden. Kataja is a Finnish word meaning "juniper".

Kataja may also refer to:

Surname 
Kataja (surname)

Organizations 
Kataja BC, a Finnish basketball club